Mary Had a Little... is a 1961 British comedy film directed by Edward Buzzell and starring Agnès Laurent, Hazel Court and Jack Watling. It takes its title from the nursery rhyme Mary Had a Little Lamb and is about a slick impresario who tries unsuccessfully to win a bet with a psychiatrist over the production of a perfect baby via hypnotism. It was shot at Walton Studios near London with sets designed by the art director John Blezard.

It has been described by film historian David McGillivray as "the first full-fledged British sex comedy."

Production and release
The film was the first of a three-picture deal between director Edward Buzzell and producer Edward Small; the other two films were never shot. The screenplay was based on the play of the same name by Arthur Herzog Jr., Muriel Herman and Al Rosen, which had its West End opening at the Strand Theatre on 27 November 1951 in a production directed by the famous farceur Ralph Lynn.

Production took place in October 1960 at Walton Studios near London under the supervision of David Rose. The theme tune, Mary Had a Little..., was written by Buzzell and sung by Dick James. The completed film turned out to be Buzzell's final directorial assignment and also the penultimate credit for its star Agnès Laurent.

Having opened in Los Angeles on 25 July 1961, the film went into general release in the UK on 3 August. Variety called it a "lower case farce", adding, "Pregnant idea, miscarries." "Whatever the merits of the original play", noted Britain's Monthly Film Bulletin, "the film remains, in its strenuously saucy way, on an abysmally unsubtle level."

Cast
 Agnès Laurent as Mary Kirk
 Hazel Court as Laurel Clive
 Jack Watling as Scott Raymond
 John Bentley as Dr Malcolm Nettel
 Michael Ward as Hunter
 Clifford Mollison as Watkins
 John Maxim as Burley Shavely
 Terry Scott as police sergeant
 Sidney Vivian as Grimmick
 Patricia Marmont as Angie
 Rose Alba as Duchess of Addlecombe
 Noel Howlett as Pottle
 Trevor Reid as Dr Liversidge
 Frances Bennett as Esther
 John Cazabon as Fitchett
 Charles Saynor as taxi driver
 Mark Hardy as Hawkes
 Michael Madden as Tigg
 Vincent Harding as Carney
 Tony Thawnton as Shakespeare

References

External links

1961 films
1961 comedy films
1960s English-language films
Films directed by Edward Buzzell
British comedy films
Films produced by Edward Small
1960s British films
Films shot at Nettlefold Studios
United Artists films